Dan Miller (born October 3, 1967) is an American musician and songwriter. He has toured and recorded with the Brooklyn-based alternative rock band They Might Be Giants since late 1998. Generally, Miller plays guitars for the band. Prior to joining TMBG, he performed with the groups Edith O and Lincoln. Having left Lincoln for personal reasons in 1998, he was contacted by John Flansburgh, who offered him a spot as lead guitarist for They Might Be Giants' Fall 1998 tour. He has also toured with John Flansburgh as Mono Puff's guitarist in the late 1990s, and played on bandmate John Linnell's State Songs tour.

Miller is known to sing backup and some lead during live performances of songs. He also occasionally plays keyboards when Linnell is playing accordion or woodwinds. Miller co-wrote the song "Infinity" with Robert Sharenow on They Might Be Giants' second children's album, Here Come the 123s.

In addition to playing with TMBG, Miller and drummer Marty Beller had their own musical production firm called MartyDan Industries. Working together, the duo had created music for film, TV, and commercials. Dan is also credited on Jonathan Coulton's album Artificial Heart.

Style 
Miller states that he commonly "used a lot of crummy guitars...such as old Harmonys and Valpros," because he "enjoys the challenge of making something bad sound good." He describes himself as a "schooled" guitarist, compared to bandmate John Flansburgh, who was self-taught.

Soundtracks 
In addition to his role as guitarist, Dan Miller is an active composer for Film and TV.

Film/Documentary

Television

Personal life 
On June 21, 2008, Miller married Annette Berry, a graphic artist and creative director based in Manhattan. Berry is credited with designing They Might Be Giants' 1999 studio album, Long Tall Weekend.

References

External links
 Dan Miller article on This Might Be a Wiki

1967 births
Lead guitarists
Living people
They Might Be Giants members